The Kent State Golden Flashes baseball team is a varsity intercollegiate athletic team of Kent State University in Kent, Ohio, United States. The team competes at the Division I level of the National Collegiate Athletic Association (NCAA) as a member of the Mid-American Conference. The head coach is retired Major League Baseball player Jeff Duncan, who was hired in June 2013.

Baseball was established at Kent State in 1914 and the team was known as the "Normal Nine". It is the second-oldest athletic team at Kent State University after the men's basketball team. Kent State began play in the Mid-American Conference in 1951, winning their first conference title in 1964 and making their first appearance in the NCAA tournament. Through the 2018 season, the Flashes have won 15 Mid-American Conference regular-season titles, 12 MAC tournament titles, 12 MAC East division titles, and have made 14 NCAA tournament appearances. The 2012 season marked the team's first appearance in the College World Series.

Home games are held at Schoonover Stadium, the team's home field since 1966. The stadium, previously known as Gene Michael Field, was renovated in 2005 and received additional upgrades in 2007, 2008, and 2013. Additionally, the Flashes have an indoor practice facility, the David and Peggy Edmonds Baseball and Softball Training Facility, which opened in 2014. Kent State has produced a number of players who have gone on to play professionally at the Major League level, including Thurman Munson, Andy Sonnanstine, Emmanuel Burriss, and Dustin Hermanson.

History
The team was established in 1914 at the new Kent State Normal School, which was established in 1910 and had its first classes in 1912 at temporary locations. The new campus opened in May 1913. The team is the second intercollegiate athletic team at Kent State, formed just after the men's basketball team, which was established in late 1913. H.E. Nickerson served as manager and William Brown was captain of that first team in 1914. No records of any games are available, though a photo of that team, labeled as the "Ex Temporé Base Ball Team", exists from that season. The following year, the "Normal Nine", coached by school custodian Alexander Whyte, played their first recorded intercollegiate games, opening the season with a 7–6 win over Baldwin Wallace College in Kent. The team finished 1–3 that season and games were held on an informal field in front of the campus, which is now largely occupied by Rockwell Hall. Alf Lovall coached the team to a 1–2 record in 1916 and Paul Chandler led the team to a 3–0 record in 1922. The records for the 1917–21 and 1923–25 seasons are incomplete, though it was during the 1923 season that the various Kent State Normal College teams began being referred to as the Silver Foxes. The team also began play at Rockwell Field around 1920, their home field through the 1941 season.

In 1927, the current "Golden Flashes" name debuted and Merle Wagoner, who also coached the football team from 1925–32, became the Flashes' first long-term coach from 1926–33 leading Kent State to a record of 27–34 in his eight seasons. The Flashes were coached by Gus Peterka for the 1934 and 1935 seasons, Donald Starn for the 1936–1938 seasons, and John Starrett for the 1939–1942 seasons leading up to World War II. During the war years, 1943–1945, Kent State did not field any varsity athletic teams, but resumed in 1946. Wesley Stevens served as head coach for 1946 and 1947 before Matt Resnick took over in 1948. He served as Kent State's coach for the longest tenure to date, from 1948 through the 1961 season compiling an overall record of 132–100–1 and 50–50 in the Mid-American Conference.

Mid-American Conference

Kent State joined the Mid-American Conference in 1951 and baseball began play in the conference in early 1952, finishing third with a 5–4 record in MAC play. Under Matt Resnick, the Flashes reached third place in 1959 with an 8–3 conference record and second place in Resnick's final season in 1961 with a conference record of 9–2. Dick Paskert took over beginning in 1962 and guided the Flashes to their first MAC regular-season title in 1964 finishing in a tie with the Ohio Bobcats at 10–1. Kent State defeated the Bobcats 6–3 in a playoff game for the Flashes' first NCAA tournament berth, where they were eliminated by the Minnesota Golden Gophers. Paskert would coach through the 1971 season with an overall record of 103–116–4 and 45–59–1 in the MAC. During his tenure he coached notable players such as Thurman Munson, Gene Michael, Rich Rollins, and Steve Stone, as well as future college football and NFL coach Nick Saban, who was also a member of the Golden Flashes football team. Art Welch took over the head coaching position from 1972–1981 and was succeeded by Bob Morgan (1982–1983) and Bob Todd (1984–1987) before Danny Hall was hired for the 1988 season.

Danny Hall
Danny Hall coached the Flashes from 1988 through the 1993 season. During his tenure, Kent State won its first MAC championship since 1964 by capturing the 1992 and 1993 regular-season and tournament titles and advancing to the NCAA tournament both years. In the 1992 NCAA tournament regional played in Tallahassee, Florida, the Flashes won their first-ever NCAA tournament game defeating the Georgia Bulldogs 5–2. Kent State fell in their next two games versus Western Carolina University and Florida State to finish 1–2. The Flashes returned to the NCAA regionals the following year playing at Baton Rouge, Louisiana. Kent State finished 2–2 that season with wins over eventual national champion Louisiana State and Western Carolina. Hall left after the 1993 season to take the head coaching job at Georgia Tech with an overall record of 208–117 and 106–73 in the MAC at Kent State.

Rick Rembielak
Rick Rembielak took over the program beginning in the 1994 season, winning the MAC regular-season in his first season and qualifying for the NCAA tournament. During his 11 seasons at Kent State, the Flashes also claimed an overall MAC title in 1996, East Division titles in 2000 and 2003, and MAC tournament titles in 2001, 2002, and 2004. Kent State returned to the NCAA tournament regionals in 2001 at Columbus, Ohio, posting a 2–2 record with wins over host Ohio State and Delaware. The Flashes played in the 2002 and 2004 tournaments, both played at South Bend, Indiana, going 0–2 and 1–2 respectively. Rembielak stepped down after the 2004 season to take the head coaching job at Wake Forest University. He had an overall record at Kent State of 373–251–1 and 200–100 in the MAC.

Scott Stricklin

Beginning in the 2005 season, Kent State alumnus Scott Stricklin took over the program after previously serving as pitching coach and recruiting coordinator at Vanderbilt University from 2000–01 and serving as an assistant coach and recruiting coordinator under former KSU coach Danny Hall at Georgia Tech from 2002–04. Under Stricklin, Kent State won six MAC East Division titles (2006, 2007, 2008, 2010, 2011, 2012), four MAC regular-season titles (2006, 2008, 2011, 2012), and five MAC tournament championships (2007, 2009, 2010, 2011, 2012). The team has made five trips to the NCAA tournament under Sticklin, including four consecutive from 2009–12. The Flashes earned their first tournament win under Sticklin in the 2009 tournament and advanced to their first regional final since 2001 in the 2011 NCAA Division I baseball tournament with wins over Texas State and host Texas.

In 2012, the Flashes won their fourth consecutive MAC tournament title and advanced to the 2012 NCAA Division I baseball tournament. The Flashes first won the Gary Regional as the region's third seed with a 3–0 record, which began with a 7–6, 21-inning win over Kentucky in the 2nd longest game in tournament history. The win was followed by a 7–4 victory over host Purdue and a 3–2 win over Kentucky in the regional final. The Flashes advanced to the Super Regional series in Eugene, Oregon, against host Oregon and won the series 2–1 with a series-clinching run in the bottom of the ninth inning of game three. During the series, the team's winning streak reached 21 games before a 3–2 Oregon win in the second game of the series. In the 2012 College World Series, after falling to Arkansas 8–1 in the opener, the Flashes defeated national top seed Florida 5–4. A 4–1 loss to defending national champion and eventual 2012 runner-up South Carolina ended the Flashes' run, giving them a national fifth-place finish. Kent State's appearance in the College World Series marked the first appearance by any Mid-American Conference team since the 1976 Eastern Michigan Eagles and first ever by a MAC team at both the Super Regional round and College World Series since the NCAA tournament expanded to 64 teams. The Flashes were also the first team from the state of Ohio to appear in the College World Series since the 1970 Ohio Bobcats.

The Flashes have also continued to have multiple players drafted into the major leagues. In 1994, seven Kent State players were selected in the Major League Baseball draft and the Flashes have had players selected in every draft since 1990 except 1998, including six in 2009, five in 2011, and six in 2012 Through the 2012 season, Stricklin has a record of 314–165, which included a program best 47–20 mark in 2012 and a 45–17 record in 2011. He won his 200th game at KSU on April 9, 2010, at Oestrike Stadium in Ypsilanti, Michigan, 16–1 over the Eastern Michigan Eagles. Stricklin's 300th career win came May 14, 2012, with a 10–4 win over the Miami Redhawks in Kent. Following the 2013 season where the Flashes won the regular-season MAC title, Stricklin was hired by Georgia as their head coach. Stricklin's record at Kent State is 350–188.

Jeff Duncan
Jeff Duncan was hired as head coach in June 2013. In his first season, Kent State finished second in the MAC East Division, but won their 11th MAC tournament title with a 3–0 win over arch-rival Akron in the championship game to advance to the NCAA tournament. The following season, the Flashes won their 10th MAC East title, but were eliminated in two games at the MAC tournament. Through the 2015 season, Duncan has an overall record of 65–45 and 34–20 in MAC play.

Postseason
Kent State has made 25 appearances in the Mid-American Conference baseball tournament, winning 12 titles through 2020. The tournament was first held in 1981 but discontinued from 1984 through 1991 and again in 2020. The Flashes made their first appearance in the 1992 tournament, which was also their first tournament title, and have qualified for every tournament since then except 2005. From 1981 through 1983 and 1992 through 1997, the tournament included only the top four teams in the conference. It was expanded to six teams in 1998 and eight teams in 2008 and remains a double-elimination format. Kent State has hosted the tournament seven times as the top seed between 1992 and 2007 after which the conference began using a neutral site. Through the 2020 tournament, the Flashes' overall tournament record is 70–36 and their 12 titles are the most in conference history.

NCAA tournament

Kent State has participated in the NCAA Division I Baseball Championship 14 times, making their first appearance in 1964 when they hosted the eventual national champion Minnesota Golden Gophers in the regional round. They have qualified automatically as champions of the MAC for every NCAA tournament appearance except 1994, when they were selected as an at-large team. Through the 2014 season the team has a 15–27 record in the tournament. The Flashes have one regional title and one super regional championship, both won in 2012.

Coaches
Through the 2017 season, Kent State has had 17 head coaches in program history. In the early years of the program, a number of the head coaches also served in the same capacity for another sport, with two coaches serving as head coach for three sports. Alexander Whyte, the head custodian of the school, was also the first head coach of the men's basketball team for two seasons, from 1913–1915. Paul Chandler, who was a professor of education at Kent State, was the first head coach of the football team and coached football for the team's first three seasons (1920–1922) and men's basketball for four seasons (1919–1923) in addition to his duties during the 1922 baseball season. Merle Wagoner, a professor in physical education, was head coach for all three teams—football, men's basketball, and baseball—at the same time for eight seasons from 1925–1933, while Starn coached football for eight seasons (1935–1942) in addition to his three seasons as baseball head coach from 1936–1938.

There are no records of teams from 1917 through 1921 due to most male students being involved in World War I. This was repeated from 1943 through 1946 because of World War II. The 1923 and 1924 seasons are mentioned in the Kent State yearbooks, known as the Chestnut Burr, from 1924 and 1925, but no head coach or season results are included. There is no record of the 1925 season in the subsequent 1926 Chestnut Burr.

Facilities

The Flashes home field is Schoonover Stadium, located on the southern edge of the Kent State campus. The team has played on the field since 1966. From 1990–2003, it was known as Gene Michael Field, named for the Major League Baseball player and manager who is a Kent native and played collegiately for the Golden Flashes. It was renamed for Kent State alumnus Hal Schoonover and his wife Julie in 2003 after the Schoonover Foundation donated $1.53 million to fund renovations. The field is named for local philanthropist Olga Mural after a $1 million donation in 2006. The 2005 renovations included new dugouts, a new scoreboard, replacement of the natural grass field with a FieldTurf playing surface, new bullpens, and a press box. Additional renovations in 2007 added chairback seating to the main grandstand, new restrooms, a concession stand, and a new locker room and player's lounge connected to the home dugout, followed in 2008 by a scoreboard upgrade. Following the team's run to the 2012 College World Series, permanent lights were added for the 2013 season. Prior to the 2014 season, a new parking area was built adjacent to the stadium along with a new entrance. Additional upgrades to the seating area are also planned as of 2015.

Adjacent to the stadium is the David and Peggy Edmonds Baseball and Softball Training Facility, which was dedicated in October 2014. The building includes a large indoor space with pitching mounds and moveable batting cages and an artificial turf playing surface. A weight room and offices for both the baseball and softball coaching staffs are also located in the facility.

Rivalries

The team's arch-rival is the Akron Zips from the University of Akron in Akron, Ohio. The series began in 1916 with a 12–1 Akron win in Kent, but did not become a conference game until 1993 when Akron joined the Mid-American Conference. The most recent game of the series was played May 16, 2015, a 3–2 Kent State win in 10 innings at Lee R. Jackson Field in Akron that clinched the season series for Kent State and the all-sports Wagon Wheel Challenge between the two schools. The rivalry unexpectedly ended after the 2015 season when the University of Akron announced the baseball team would be eliminated because of budget concerns. With Akron reinstating baseball for the 2020 season, the rivalry was scheduled to resume April 1 with a game in Kent, followed by a rematch April 28 at Canal Park in downtown Akron, the home of the AA-level minor league Akron RubberDucks. The games were canceled in March 2020, along with the remainder of the 2020 season due to the COVID-19 pandemic. Instead, the rivalry resumed in 2021, with five games in Kent, where the Flashes took three of five. Through the 2022 season, Kent State leads the series 114–59–1. 

The Zips and Flashes have met three times in the Mid-American Conference baseball tournament, with Kent State taking two of the three games. The Flashes defeated the Zips 16–3 in their first tournament meeting, a 1995 semifinal game, while the Zips claimed a 4–1 win in the first round of the 1996 tournament. The most recent tournament meeting between the two rivals was the championship game of the 2014 tournament, a 3–0 Kent State win and the only time the two teams met in the tournament final.

From 2007 to 2015, the Zips and Flashes played in the annual Diamond Classic for Kids at Canal Park to benefit Akron Children's Hospital. Leading up to the game, players and mascots from both schools visited children in the hospital, which overlooks Canal Park. The 2007, 2008, and 2009 games were all played in addition to the regularly-scheduled conference series and the game itself was a non-conference game. Beginning in 2010, the game was made part of the 3-game series regardless of which team was hosting in the given year and counted in the conference standings. 

Kent State's most frequent opponents through 2022 are long-time MAC rivals, with the Miami RedHawks being the most frequent at 208 meetings, followed by the Bowling Green Falcons at 200 games, and the Ohio Bobcats at 195. The series with Bowling Green began in 1936 and has been a conference game since the Falcons started MAC play in 1953, while Miami and Ohio were members of the MAC when Kent State started conference play in 1952.

Outside the MAC, the Flashes most common opponent is the Youngstown State Penguins of nearby Youngstown, Ohio, a member of the Horizon League. The two teams meet on a regular basis and typically play at least one game per season at each home field. The Flashes and Penguins have met 95 times, with Kent State holding a 72–22–1 edge in the series after taking the first meeting of 2023.

Kent State also had a regular rivalry with the Cleveland State Vikings that began in 1933 and spanned 88 games. The rivalry ended in 2011 after Cleveland State elected to discontinue their baseball program. Kent State won the final meeting between the two teams 6–2, a game that was a home game for the Vikings, but was played in Kent at Schoonover Stadium due to a rainout and scheduling conflict at the original site.

Awards

All-Americans
Through the 2016 season, Kent State has had 20 players named as first, second, and third team All-Americans by various collegiate baseball organizations and publications. Two players have been named consensus First Team All-Americans in program history, John Van Benschoten in 2001 and Eric Lauer in 2016. Lauer was also named National Player of the Year by Collegiate Baseball Newspaper in 2016.

See also
List of NCAA Division I baseball programs

References

External links